Nicholas D. Regilio (born September 4, 1978) is an American former professional baseball pitcher. He played in Major League Baseball (MLB) for the Texas Rangers.

Career
Regilio was selected by the Texas Rangers in the 2nd round of the 1999 Major League Baseball Draft after attending Jacksonville University for two years. Prior to JU he played at Embry–Riddle Aeronautical University for a year. Regilio spent six years in the minors before the Rangers called him up in 2004. Regilio appeared in 24 games including four starts for the Rangers over the next two years. He became a free agent after the 2005 season.

Before the 2008 season, Regilio signed a minor league contract with the Houston Astros and was assigned to their Triple-A affiliate, the Round Rock Express. In 50 games for Round Rock, he had a 3.00 ERA and nine saves.

He became a free agent at the end of the season and signed a minor league contract with the Detroit Tigers. Regilio was later released by the Tigers on May 11, 2009.

Regalio has since become a baseball coach at New Smyrna Beach High School.

References

External links

1978 births
Living people
Arizona League Rangers players
Baseball players from Miami
Charlotte Rangers players
Embry–Riddle Eagles baseball players
Frisco RoughRiders players
Jacksonville Dolphins baseball players
Major League Baseball pitchers
Navegantes del Magallanes players
American expatriate baseball players in Venezuela
Oklahoma RedHawks players
Peoria Saguaros players
Pulaski Rangers players
Round Rock Express players
Texas Rangers players
Toledo Mud Hens players
Tulsa Drillers players